Herbert C. Klein (born June 24, 1930) is an American businessman, attorney, and politician who represented New Jersey in the United States House of Representatives for one term from 1993 to 1995.

Early life and education
Klein was born in Newark, New Jersey. He received his BA from Rutgers University in 1950 and a JD from Harvard Law School in 1953, as well as an LLM from New York University in 1958.

He served in the United States Air Force from 1954 to 1956, where he was assigned to the Wright-Patterson Air Force Base near Dayton, Ohio. Admitted to the bar in 1953, he commenced the practice of law in Passaic, New Jersey.

Political career

He served as a member of the New Jersey General Assembly from 1972 to 1976, authoring the law that created the New Jersey Economic Development Authority. In the Assembly, was co-counsel on a bond issue for New Jersey Sports and Exposition Authority, and worked for the introduction of state income tax. He also served as Executive Director of the Passaic County Democratic Committee from 1977 to 1981. He was elected as a Democrat to the 103rd United States Congress in 1992 to succeed retiring eleven-term incumbent Robert Roe in the historically Democratic eighth district.

Tenure in Congress
During his tenure in the United States House of Representatives, Klein was a leader on the House Banking Committee, where he was responsible for several legislative initiatives. He co-authored the bills that authorized interstate branch banking and was the architect of the provision which sparked passage of the legislation that ended the problems in the savings and loan industry.

Klein also served on the House Science Committee, where he co-authored the National Competitiveness Act which helped to strengthen American industry. Klein was a member of the New Jersey General Assembly from 1972 to 1976, where he was chair of the majority caucus. He wrote the law that created the New Jersey Economic Development Authority and was co-counsel on bond issue for New Jersey Sports and Exposition Authority. Klein was defeated for re-election by Clifton city councilman and Passaic County freeholder Bill Martini, making him one of 54 Democrats to lose their seats in the 1994 Congressional Elections.

Business and legal career
Klein obtained one of the largest civil verdicts on behalf of a plaintiff in New Jersey in Laganella v. Braen.

Affiliations
Klein has served continuously as a Trustee of the First Real Estate Investment Trust of New Jersey since 1961, leading the Trust as President from 1991 to 1993. He is past member of the Board of Trustees of Rutgers University, past President of the Board of Trustees of Beth Israel Hospital, a member of the Governor's Committee for the New Jersey Development Council, a member of the Board of Overseers of the Rutgers University Foundation, a member of the Executive Committee of the board of directors of the Rutgers University Foundation, Chairman of the President's Council of the Rutgers University Foundation, a member of the Board of Trustees of the Montclair Art Museum, and a member of the board of directors of multiple philanthropic organizations.

See also
 List of Jewish members of the United States Congress

References

External links

1930 births
Living people
Jewish American military personnel
Politicians from Clifton, New Jersey
Harvard Law School alumni
Jewish members of the United States House of Representatives
Democratic Party members of the New Jersey General Assembly
Politicians from Newark, New Jersey
Rutgers University alumni
United States Air Force officers
Democratic Party members of the United States House of Representatives from New Jersey
American people of Hungarian-Jewish descent
American people of Belarusian-Jewish descent
Lawyers from Newark, New Jersey
Military personnel from Newark, New Jersey
21st-century American Jews
Members of Congress who became lobbyists